An oxbow is part of oxen tack.

Oxbow may also refer to:

 Oxbow lake, a U-shaped lake that forms when a wide meander of a river is cut off

Places

Canada
Oxbow, Saskatchewan, a town
Oxbow National Historic Site, an historic place in Northumberland County, New Brunswick

United States
Oxbow, Maine, a plantation in Aroostook County
Oxbow, New York, a hamlet in Jefferson County
Oxbow, North Dakota, a small city in Cass County
Oxbow, Oregon, a populated place in Baker County
Oxbo, Wisconsin, an unincorporated community
Oxbow Creek, a tributary of Tunkhannock Creek in Wyoming County, Pennsylvania
Oxbow Dam, located on the Snake River near Oxbow, Oregon
The Oxbow (Connecticut River), the body of water attached to the Connecticut River at Northampton, Massachusetts
Ox-Bow School of Art and Artists Residency, in Saugatuck, Michigan

Other uses
Oxbow (band), a music group from San Francisco
Oxbow (horse), the 2013 Preakness Stakes winner
Oxbow (surfwear), a French sporting equipment and apparel company
Oxbow School, a single semester high school in Napa, California
The Oxbow, an 1836 painting by Thomas Cole
Oxbow Corporation, an American energy company owned by Bill Koch
"Oxbow", a song by Waxahatchee from her album Saint Cloud